Hisonotus notopagos is a species of catfish in the family Loricariidae. It is native to South America, where it occurs in the Camaquã River drainage and the Lagoa dos Patos system in Brazil. The species reaches 3.7 cm (1.5 inches) SL.

References 

Otothyrinae
Fish described in 2011
Fauna of Brazil